Shape is a fictional character appearing in American comic books published by Marvel Comics. The character was created by Mark Gruenwald.

Fictional character biography
The Shape (real name Raleigh Lund) was born in Simak, Lowengard, in the United States of the alternate Earth of the Squadron Supreme, Earth-712. Although he appears to be an adult male, his emotional and intellectual development is comparable to that of a child.

Originally, he was a member of the criminal Institute of Evil, the Squadron's arch-foes, although, lacking sincere criminal intent, he was mostly following the lead of team leader Ape-X, who had been his friend "for years and years." After the Institute of Evil lost a battle against the Squadron, all of the Institute's members underwent behavior modification, their criminal records were pardoned, and they all joined the Squadron. Now, as a public crusader and adventurer, Shape helped supervise the manufacturing of force field belts. He also helped his fellow superheroes and babysat for Arcanna Jones' three children, becoming especially close with Drusilla Jones. Eventually the behavior modification was reversed by the Squadron's opponents the Redeemers, but the Shape, having never been a criminal at heart in the first place, still chose to side with the Squadron against Nighthawk and the Redeemers. After the battle, Shape helped get the pregnant Arcanna to the delivery room after she collapsed.

Later, Shape accompanied the Squadron in a futile struggle against the Nth Man. As a result, Shape and the Squadron traveled to Earth.  There, Shape and Haywire were mentally coerced by the Over-Mind to prevent Quasar from following the starship in which the Over-Mind had kidnapped the Squadron Supreme.

Powers and abilities

The Shape's entire body is extremely rubbery, putty-like and malleable. He can shift up to 80% of his physical mass at will, thus altering his entire shape. He can use this mass to elongate, compress, or enlarge various parts of his body, or form non-humanoid shapes such as hammer-shaped fists or a trampoline-shaped torso, or taking the shape of a hang glider. His bones stretch to a maximum of five times their ordinary length. The Shape's below normal intelligence prevents him from thinking of more creative uses for his shifting body mass.

His body tissue can resist extreme temperatures and pressures, burning, lacerations, ballistic penetration, and impacts, without sustaining injury. The Shape has a high physical pain threshold, and superhuman durability. He is not invulnerable; certain extreme physical injuries are beyond his ability to resist.

Other versions

Supreme Power
In Part III: High Command, Shape is introduced as Raleigh Lund, a dim-witted, morbidly obese former janitor abandoned as a child by his parents.  He survived from a very early age by eating discarded food and sleeping in dumpsters. He possesses superhuman strength and apparent invulnerability. In Supreme Power: Hyperion, he is described by General Alexander as the perfect soldier—loyal, invulnerable, and strong—though he is quite lacking in the area of independent thought and strategy.

References

External links
http://www.marvel.com/universe/Shape_%28Earth-712%29

Characters created by Mark Gruenwald
Comics characters introduced in 1986
Fictional characters who can stretch themselves
Fictional characters with superhuman durability or invulnerability
Marvel Comics characters who are shapeshifters
Marvel Comics male supervillains
Squadron Supreme